Lorna Thompson may refer to:

Lorna Thompson, fictional character in Cuckoo (TV series)
Lorna Thompson, fictional character in Murder, She Wrote, played by Heidi Swedberg
Lorna Thompson, fictional character in We Are Monsters, played by Maisie Williams